was a Japanese comedian.

Nakayama was born in Tokushima, Tokushima. She was represented with Yoshimoto Creative Agency in Osaka.

References

External links
 – Yoshimoto Kogyo official site 
 
 

Japanese comedians
People from Tokushima (city)
1938 births
2017 deaths
Japanese women comedians